Brownsboro is an unincorporated community in Caldwell County, in the U.S. state of Texas. The community had a population of 50 in 2000.  It is located within the Greater Austin metropolitan area.

History
The area in what is known as Brownsboro today was first settled in the 1850s. This community grew up around Clear Fork Baptist Church and was named after R.A. Brown. The discovery of oil in nearby fields gave the community's economy a large boost in the 1920s. There was a store and a gin, including the church, all serving about 50 families. By the 1930s it also had its own baseball team, but the community's population had fallen to 25 by the 1940s and only a few scattered houses remained in Brownsboro by the 1980s. By 2000, its population had risen to 50 people.

Geography

Education
Brownsboro had its own school in the 1920s. Children in the area attended Oakland School until it became a part of the Lockhart Independent School District in 1949. The Lockhart Independent School District still serves the community.

References

Unincorporated communities in Caldwell County, Texas
Unincorporated communities in Texas